The Gull River Formation is a geological formation of Middle Ordovician age (Caradoc Stage), which outcrops in Ontario, Canada. Lithologically, the formation is dominated by light grey to brown limestones and greenish gray dolomites with thin shale and sandstone interlayers.

Fossil content

Invertebrates

Chelicerates

Flora

Acritarchs

See also

 List of fossiliferous stratigraphic units in Ontario

References

Ordovician Ontario
Ordovician southern paleotemperate deposits
Ordovician southern paleotropical deposits